The 2003–04 Perth Glory SC season was the club's eighth season since its establishment in 1996, and its final season in the National Soccer League (NSL). Perth Glory finished top of the league and were crowned champions after defeating Parramatta Power in the 2004 NSL Grand Final.

First-team squad
Squad at end of season

Final standings

Home and away season

Finals

References

Perth Glory FC seasons
Perth Glory